Russellite is a bismuth tungstate mineral with the chemical formula Bi2WO6. It crystallizes in the orthorhombic crystal system.

Russellite is named for the mineralogist Sir Arthur Russell, and the type locality is the Castle-an-Dinas Mine, near St Columb Major in Cornwall, where it was found in 1938 in wolframite.
It occurs as a secondary alteration of other bismuth bearing minerals in tin - tungsten 
hydrothermal ore deposits, pegmatites and greisens. It typically occurs associated with native bismuth, bismuthinite, bismite, wolframite, ferberite, scheelite, ferritungstite, anthoinite, mpororoite, koechlinite, cassiterite, topaz, muscovite, tourmaline and quartz.

References

Tungstate minerals
Bismuth minerals
Orthorhombic minerals
Minerals in space group 29